Katharina Galor (born 1966) is a German-born Israeli art historian and archaeologist specializing in Israel-Palestine. She has been teaching at Brown University since 1998, where she is Hirschfeld Visiting Associate Professor of Judaic Studies and Visiting Associate Professor of Urban Studies.

She was educated in Germany (Comenius Gymnasium), France (Université d’Aix-Marseille), Israel (Hebrew University) and the US (Brown University).

She has held visiting teaching appointments at the École biblique et archéologique française and the Rothberg School at the Hebrew University in Jerusalem, at Humboldt University in Berlin, and at Tufts University and the Rhode Island School of Design in the US. She was a fellow at the W.F. Albright Institute of Archaeological Research in Jerusalem, at the Institute of Archaeology at Hebrew University, at the Antike Kolleg Berlin, the Selma Stern Zentrum für Jüdische Studien Berlin-Brandenburg, and the Chronoi Center of the Einstein Foundation Berlin. She served as President of the American Institute of Archaeology, Narragansett Chapter.

Galor worked as a field archaeologist in France and the Levant between 1988 and 2006 with a scholarly focus on ethnicity, religious affiliation, and gender. Sites she worked on included Apollonia–Arsuf. Since 2006 her interests have shifted to encompass cultural heritage studies with a focus on the Israel-Palestine conflict.

Her publications include The Archaeology of Jerusalem: From the Origins to the Ottomans (Yale University Press, 2013; co-authored with Hanswulf Bloedhorn), Finding Jerusalem: Archaeology between Science and Ideology (University of California Press, 2017), and The Moral Triangle: Germans, Israelis, Palestinians (Duke University Press, 2020; co-authored with Sa’ed Atshan). In 2018, Galor was awarded a three-year grant from the Leo Baeck Institute to complete her current book project on Jewish women.

Publications
 The Archaeology of Jerusalem: From the Origins to the Ottomans (New Haven: Yale University Press, 2013; with H. Bloedhorn).
 Finding Jerusalem: Archaeology between Science and Ideology (Berkeley: University of California Press, 2017).
 The Moral Triangle: Germans, Israelis, Palestinians (Durham: Duke University Press, 2020; with Sa’ed Atshan).
 Qumran. The Site of the Dead Sea Scrolls. Archaeological Interpretations and Debates. Proceedings of the Conference held at Brown University November 17–19, 2002, (eds.) K. Galor, J.-B. Humbert, and J. Zangenberg, (Boston: Brill, 2006).
 Crossing the Rift: Resources, Routes, Settlement Patterns and Interaction in the Wadi Arabah, Proceedings of the Conference held at the Fernbank Museum of Natural History in Atlanta, GA, November 19, 2003, (eds.) P. Bienkowski and K. Galor, in Levant Supplementary Series 3 (Winona Lake: Eisenbrauns, 2006).
 From Antioch to Alexandria. Studies in Domestic Architecture during the Roman and Byzantine Periods, (eds.) Galor, K. and Waliszewski, T. Warsaw: Institute of Archaeology, University of Warsaw, 2007.
Unearthing Jerusalem: 150 Years of Archaeological Research in the Holy City. Proceedings of the Conference held at Brown University November 12–14, 2006, (eds.) K. Galor and G. Avni (Winona Lake: Eisenbrauns, 2011).
 Gender and Social Norms in Ancient Israel, Early Judaism and Christianity. Texts and Material Culture. Proceedings of the conference held at the University of Koblenz-Landau, Germany, February 18–21, 2016, (eds.), M. Bauks, K. Galor and J. Hartenstein, in Journal of Ancient Judaism. Supplements (Göttingen: Vandenhoeck & Ruprecht, 2019).

References

External links
 Faculty page at Brown University
 Lecture: Kenyon Institute Jerusalem: /* https://www.youtube.com/watch?v=m6BHXtwu1ys*/
 Lecture: Jewish Museum Berlin: /* https://www.jmberlin.de/en/talk-katharina-galor-the-temple-mount

Qumran
Israeli archaeologists
Living people
1966 births
Israeli women archaeologists
Israeli women academics
Brown University faculty
Aix-Marseille University alumni
Hebrew University of Jerusalem alumni
Brown University alumni
Academic staff of École Biblique
German art historians
German women archaeologists